Lisa Dean is an American set decorator. She was nominated for two Academy Awards in the category Best Art Direction.

Selected filmography
 Dances with Wolves (1990)
 Saving Private Ryan (1998)

References

External links

Year of birth missing (living people)
Living people
American set decorators
Place of birth missing (living people)